Hillcrest Cemetery is a historic cemetery in Holly Springs, Mississippi, United States. Established in 1837, it is known as the "Little Arlington of the South." It contains the burials of five Confederate generals.

Location
The cemetery is located on Center Street in Holly Springs, Marshall County, Mississippi.

History
The cemetery was established in 1837, when William S. Randolph, an early settler of Holly Springs, donated the land. The railings were designed by the Jones, McElwain and Company Iron Foundry prior to the Civil War.

It is known as the "Little Arlington of the South" in allusion to the Arlington National Cemetery near Washington, D.C. Notable burials include five generals of the Confederate States Army: Samuel Benton, Winfield S. Featherston, Daniel Govan, Edward Walthall, and Absolom M. West. Other notable burials include Wall Doxey, Benjamin D. Nabers, Hiram Rhodes Revels, and James F. Trotter.  Also buried there are painter Kate Freeman Clark, the wife and son of Alamo defender Micajah Autry, and architect Spires Boling.

The cemetery was vandalized in 1980.

Heritage significance
It has been listed on the National Register of Historic Places since June 28, 1982.

References

External links

 

Buildings and structures in Holly Springs, Mississippi
Cemeteries on the National Register of Historic Places in Mississippi
1837 establishments in Mississippi
National Register of Historic Places in Marshall County, Mississippi